Eucalyptus morrisii, commonly known as grey mallee, is a species of mallee or straggly tree that is endemic to western New South Wales. It has rough, fibrous or flaky bark on some or all of the trunk, smooth greyish bark above, lance-shaped adult leaves, flower buds usually in groups of three, white flowers and conical or hemispherical fruit.

Description
It has rough, fibrous or flaky, sometimes compacted, dark grey bark on part or all of the trunk, smooth greyish bark above. Flowering occurs in December and the flowers are white.

Taxonomy and naming
Eucalyptus morrisii was first described in 1900 by Richard Thomas Baker in Proceedings of the Linnean Society of New South Wales from specimens collected "near Girilambone, on stony or rocky hills". It was first collected by William Baeuerlen, (previously known as Wilhelm Bäuerlen). The specific epithet honours "R. N. Morris, LL.D., the present Superintendent of Technical Education in New South Wales, in acknowledgment of his co-operation in our work on the economies of the genus Eucalyptus".

Distribution and habitat
Grey mallee is usually found in low mallee communities, growing on shallow soil on stony hills. It occurs in the area between Bourke, Nyngan and Cobar in central-western New South Wales.

References

morrisii
Myrtales of Australia
Flora of New South Wales
Plants described in 1900
Taxa named by Richard Thomas Baker